Dick Nalley (January 24, 1955 – August 28, 2002) was an American bobsledder. He competed in the two man and the four man events at the 1980 Winter Olympics.

References

1955 births
2002 deaths
American male bobsledders
Olympic bobsledders of the United States
Bobsledders at the 1980 Winter Olympics
Sportspeople from Indianapolis